Charles Lyell, 3rd Baron Lyell, DL (27 March 1939 – 11 January 2017) was a British politician and Conservative member of the House of Lords.

Lord Lyell was the son of Charles Lyell, 2nd Baron Lyell and Sophie Mary Trafford (1916–2012).

He succeeded to the peerage in 1943 at the age of 4 when his father was killed in action during the Second World War and was posthumously awarded the Victoria Cross. He was educated at Eton College and Christ Church, Oxford. On the formation of a Conservative government after the 1979 general election, Lord Lyell was made a House of Lords whip, serving until 1984. He was then moved to the Northern Ireland Office as a Parliamentary Under Secretary of State where he remained until he left the government in 1989.

With the passage of the House of Lords Act 1999, Lord Lyell along with almost all other hereditary peers lost his automatic right to sit in the House of Lords. He was however elected as one of the 92 elected hereditary peers to remain in the House of Lords pending completion of House of Lords reform.

He was a supporter of Everton Football Club and a shareholder. He said 
"I have been a great supporter, all round the world, of Everton Football Club. I am 200 miles from there now and 300 miles away when I am in Scotland. But thanks to the BBC World Service, when I have been in, for example, Seattle or elsewhere around the world, great happiness, or perhaps sometimes sadness, has been caused by Everton's results. I declare an interest also in that I am a shareholder."
However, his true football love was Forfar Athletic F.C. He was Honorary Patron of the Angus League Two side and had been a supporter since a young age. He was a regular visitor to Station Park, always sponsoring the last home game of the season.

He died on 11 January 2017. At that time, he was the third longest serving member of the House of Lords, after Lord Carrington and Lord Denham. The barony became extinct on his death.

References

Ministerial posts

External links
The Telegraph obituary

Lyell, Charles
Lyell, Charles
People educated at Eton College
Alumni of Christ Church, Oxford
Lyell, Charles Lyell, 3rd Baron
Lyell, Charles
Deputy Lieutenants of Angus
Schuyler family
Van Cortlandt family
English people of Dutch descent
Northern Ireland Office junior ministers
Hereditary peers elected under the House of Lords Act 1999